Chicken Licken can refer to:

Henny Penny, a  also known as "Chicken Little" or "Chicken Licken" after the main character 
Chicken Licken (restaurant), an African fast food chain